RAF North Coates was a Royal Air Force station in Lincolnshire, England, six miles south-east of Cleethorpes, and close to the mouth of the Humber estuary. It was an active air station during World War I, and then again from the mid-1920s. Between 1942 and 1945, during the Second World War, it was the home of a Coastal Command Strike Wing, and from 1958 was a base for Bloodhound surface-to-air missiles, until closed in 1990.

World War I
The camp at North Coates Fitties was opened by the army in 1914 and occupied by men of the Lincolnshire Regiment. In 1916 it was converted into a forward landing ground for aircraft from the Royal Flying Corps' No. 33 (Home Defence) Squadron, based at Brattleby, and tasked with coastal patrols in North Lincolnshire. From October 1918 it was occupied by No. 248 Squadron RAF, but after the armistice the airfield was gradually run down and eventually closed in March 1919, and the land was returned to its original owner.

Inter-war period
The site was reacquired in 1926 to serve as a base for aircraft using the bombing range at nearby Donna Nook, and designated No. 2 Armament Practice Camp. The station also served as a training facility for observers and air gunners from 1936 up until the beginning of World War II.

World War II
Following the declaration of war on 3 September 1939, the training units were transferred elsewhere, and No. 2 Recruit Training Pool was formed at the airfield, followed by the Ground Defence Gunnery School in November. In February 1940 the station was transferred to No. 16 Group, Coastal Command, and was first occupied by No.'s 235, 236 and 248 Squadrons, flying the Blenheim in both bomber and long-range fighter variants, until April 1940. North Coates was then occupied by a number of Coastal Command squadrons over the next two years, mostly RAF, but including Fleet Air Arm and Royal Canadian Air Force units, flying a variety of aircraft, mainly Beaufort and Hudson light bombers, but also Hampden and Swordfish torpedo bombers, Avro Anson reconnaissance aircraft and Maryland light bombers.

North Coates Strike Wing

In September 1942 it became the base for the North Coates Strike Wing formed from 143, 236 and 254 Squadrons, flying the Beaufighter in the heavy fighter, bomber and "Torbeau" torpedo bomber variants, to attack enemy shipping in the North Sea. The first operation of the Strike Wing took place on 20 November 1942 when Beaufighters from 236 and 254 Squadrons took off to attack a convoy of twelve to sixteen ships heading towards Rotterdam. The weather was poor, the squadrons lost contact with each other and the convoy was protected by Fw 190 fighters. Only three enemy ships were damaged but three Beaufighters were shot down and four so badly damaged that they crashed or made forced landings. The Strike Wing was promptly withdrawn from service for intensive training, during which time, between November 1942 and early 1943, the east-west concrete runway was laid.

It was not until 18 April 1943 that the Wing launched its second operation, when nine "Torbeaus" of 254 Squadron, six Beaufighter bombers of 236 Squadron, and six Beaufighter heavy fighters of 143 Squadron, with Spitfires and Mustangs providing air cover, attacked a heavily escorted convoy off the Dutch coast. While the Beaufighters attacked the escort vessels with bombs, machine-gun and cannon fire, the "Torbeaus" attacked the largest merchant vessel. In the attack two s were set on fire and an armed trawler was also damaged. Two confirmed torpedo strikes were made on the merchant vessel, which was left listing and on fire. The co-ordinated attack lasted only 15 minutes and only slight damage was sustained by two or three aircraft. Another operation at the end of the month resulted in the sinking of two merchant vessels and a trawler, with damage to several escort ships, for the loss of one Beaufighter. In June the Strike Wing began to use the RP-3 rocket projectile and by the middle of the year had, along with the minelayers of Bomber Command and the Royal Navy's Nore Flotilla, rendered the Port of Rotterdam almost unusable. Ship captains bringing in iron ore from Sweden began to demand bonuses of up to 300 per cent for risking their ships. They had also lost 120 aircraft and 241 aircrew.
The RAF North Coates Strike Wing War Memorial in Cleethorpes

Post-war
North Coates was closed in August 1946 and transferred to Maintenance Command, becoming a storage site for No. 25 Maintenance Unit, and was then transferred to No. 61 Maintenance Unit in October. In December 1946 the station was transferred to Flying Training Command, and in January 1947 became No. 1 Initial Training School. However the airfield’s isolation during the severe winter of 1947 meant that the Officer Cadets were soon relocated.

In May 1948 it was transferred to No. 24 Group, Technical Training Command, and became the location of the School of Explosives Inspection (15 S of T.T) and also No. 5131 Bomb Disposal Wing. In August 1953 the station became the home of No. 54 Maintenance Unit, tasked with breaking up redundant and crashed aircraft for spare parts, coming under No. 43 Group, Maintenance Command, in December 1954. Between February 1955 and October 1957 North Coates was the base of "B" Flight, No. 275 (Air Sea Rescue) Squadron flying Bristol Sycamore HR.14. helicopters.

In April 1956 the airfield was selected as the site of the RAF's first Surface to Air Guided Weapons base, housing forty-eight Bloodhound surface-to-air missiles. In July 1956 work began on the construction of the missile facility, including missile pads, Tactical Control Centre, Missile Repair Section, and Servicing Hangar. In October 1957 No. 17 Joint Services Trials Unit was formed there to carry out operational trials of the Bloodhound Mk. II. The Bloodhounds remained at North Coates until mid-1990, and the station was finally closed in December, and the site transferred to the Defence Land Agency for disposal.

In April 1992 the entire airfield, technical and domestic site including the NCO and officers married quarters were sold to Roger Byron-Collins' Welbeck Estate Group. Over the ensuing 8 years the individual houses were sold and new uses were found for a variety of buildings
including the Station HQ, Officers and Junior ranks messes, accommodation blocks, NAAFI and church. The airfield and related land were sold in  1999 to local farmer George Henry Parker who returned the majority of the airfield back to agriculture and demolished many ancillary buildings relating to the airfield.  The concrete runway, hard standings and the taxiways were removed. One hangar is still used by the North Coates Flying Club, who laid a grass airstrip alongside the line of the old runway.

In May 2020, a wreck believed to be Beaufighter JM333 of No. 254 Squadron was uncovered by shifting sands on Cleethorpes beach near Grimsby. The aircraft was ditched on April 21, 1944 shortly after takeoff from North Coates when both engines failed. The crew survived uninjured.

Squadrons

See also
 List of former Royal Air Force stations

Notes

References

Further reading

External links

 
 
 
 
 
 
 

Royal Flying Corps airfields
Royal Air Force stations in Lincolnshire
Royal Air Force stations of World War II in the United Kingdom